Enneabatrachus is an extinct genus of prehistoric frogs known from the late Jurassic Morrison Formation. It is represented by a single species, E. hechti (named in 1993), whose remains have been recovered from stratigraphic zone 5. One specimen has been recovered from Quarry 9 of Como Bluff in Wyoming and another specimen was later reported from Dinosaur National Monument. A small discoglossid frog whose name means "nine frog" after the quarry in which it was discovered. The Como Bluff specimen was an ilium only a few millimeters long. E. hechti's live weight would have only been a few grams.

See also
 Prehistoric amphibian
 List of prehistoric amphibians
 Paleobiota of the Morrison Formation

References

Prehistoric frogs
Morrison fauna